"Evening Star" is a song written by Barry and Maurice Gibb, and recorded by American country music artist Kenny Rogers.  It was released in June 1984 as the third single from the album Eyes That See in the Dark.  The song reached No. 11 on the Billboard Hot Country Singles & Tracks chart.

This track, along with "Buried Treasure" have backing vocals by the Gatlin Brothers. No bass guitar is credited, but it appears to be the work of Maurice Gibb, judging by the match to the demos and the slap bass sound on this song.

Personnel
Kenny Rogers — vocals
Barry Gibb - background vocals, guitar
Maurice Gibb — guitar, bass, synthesizer
Larry Gatlin — background vocals
Steve Gatlin — background vocals
Rudy Gatlin— background vocals
Albhy Galuten — piano, synthesizer
Fred Tackett — guitar
Mitch Holder — guitar
John Hobbs — piano
Paul Leim — drums

Chart performance

Barry Gibb version
Barry Gibb's original version of "Evening Star" was released on The Eyes That See in the Dark Demos in 2006. This song is a country singalong, with harmony vocals and Maurice Gibb contributing both a slap bass and a snappy lead guitar break. But on Kenny Rogers' version, the vocals would again be done by the Gatlin Brothers for release, and the break was eliminated.

Personnel
 Barry Gibb — lead and harmony vocals, guitar
 Maurice Gibb — guitar, bass, synthesizer

References

1984 singles
1983 songs
Barry Gibb songs
Kenny Rogers songs
Songs written by Barry Gibb
Songs written by Maurice Gibb
Song recordings produced by Barry Gibb
RCA Records singles
Song recordings produced by Albhy Galuten